Burbank station may refer to:
Burbank station (DART), light rail station in Dallas
Downtown Burbank station, commuter rail station in Burbank, California

See also
Burbank Airport station (disambiguation)